2018 Libya migrant shipwrecks began on January 9, 2018, when up to 100 migrants went missing as their migrant rubber boat was punctured and sank off Libya's coast.

Description
On January 9, 2018, up to 100 migrants went missing from Libya when their rubber boat was punctured and sank off Libya's coast. Libyan coastguard had picked up nearly 300 migrants from three boats off the coast, but one rubber boat was punctured and the coastguard only found 16 survivors clinging to its wreckage. The coastguard said the number of missing might be as high as 100. The boat sank off the city of Khoms, around 100 kilometres (60 miles) east of the Libyan capital.

Libyan coastguard picked up nearly 300 migrants from three boats off the coast of Libya on Tuesday, January 9, 1980.

On January 6, 2018, sixty-four people died after a dinghy sank in the Mediterranean. The Italian coastguard rescued 86 people from the boat hours after it sustained a puncture and started sinking on Saturday morning. The deaths represented the first large-scale migrant tragedy of 2018 in the Mediterranean.

Background history
A total of 2,832 migrants died on the Central Mediterranean route between Libya and Italy in 2017, down from 4,581 in 2016. The number of migrants who reached Italy in 2017 was 119,310, down from 181,436 in 2016.

References

External links 

2018 in Libya
Migrant shipwreck
Maritime incidents in Libya
January 2018 events in Africa
Transport disasters involving refugees of the Arab Winter (2011–present)
Migrant boat disasters in the Mediterranean Sea
Maritime incidents related to the European migrant crisis